David G. Kirby is a former professor of Modern European History at the School of Slavonic and East European Studies in London, which is today part of University College London.

Selected bibliography
 Finland in the Twentieth Century (1979)
 Northern Europe in the Early Modern Period (1990)
 The Baltic World 1772–1993 (1995)
 The Baltic and the North Seas, with Merja-Liisa Hinkkanen (2000)
 A Concise History of Finland (2006)

Lectures
 "European Integration and the Baltic Region: A Historical Perspective." (May 28–29, 1998. See https://web.archive.org/web/20110217103250/http://depts.washington.edu/baltic/newsletter/spring98.html#kirby )

Contributor
 Baltic Worlds, http://balticworlds.com/contributors/david-kirby/

Living people
Academics of the UCL School of Slavonic and East European Studies
British writers
Year of birth missing (living people)
Place of birth missing (living people)